Ju-Do Chun (Hangul: 전주도, Hanja; born January 25, 1964, in Gangwon-do, South Korea) is a former boxer from South Korea.

Pro career
Chun fought for the inaugural IBF super flyweight title in 1983, winning  with a 5th-round TKO over Ken Kasugai in Osaka, Japan. He became the youngest Korean boxer to win a world title, at 19 years and 10 months old, and this record remains unbroken today. He defended the belt five times before losing it to future 3-time IBF super flyweight champion Ellyas Pical in Jakarta, Indonesia in 1985. After two more losses against lackluster competition, Chun retired in 1990.

External links
 

1964 births
Super-flyweight boxers
International Boxing Federation champions
World super-flyweight boxing champions
Living people
South Korean male boxers